Debra Holloway (January 23, 1955 – 2011) is a former U.S. Olympian in taekwondo.  She was a seven-time US bantamweight champion, and earned a silver medal in the 1988 Seoul Olympics despite fighting her final round with a broken finger.  She attended Howard University and trained in Taekwondo under Dong Ja Yang.

References

1950s births
2011 deaths
American female taekwondo practitioners
Taekwondo practitioners at the 1988 Summer Olympics
Medalists at the 1988 Summer Olympics
Olympic silver medalists for the United States in taekwondo
21st-century American women
20th-century American women